Pulverbach may refer to:

Pulverbach (Selke), a river of Saxony-Anhalt, Germany, tributary of the Selke
Pulverbach (Klosterbach), a river of Bavaria, Germany, tributary of the Klosterbach